John Richard Sisson (born October 16, 1936) was the acting President of Ohio State University from  December 15, 1997, to June 30, 1998, after Elwood Gordon Gee  left the office.

Sisson graduated from Ohio State with a Bachelor of Arts in international studies in 1958 and a Master of Arts in political science in 1960. He went on to the University of California, Berkeley and received a Ph.D. in 1967. After completing his education, Sisson held administrative and academic positions at the United States Military Academy, UCLA, and Ohio State University.  At Ohio State Sisson was Provost from 1993 to 1998. Sisson returned to teaching comparative politics at Ohio State University until his retirement in 2002. In 2002 the political science department at Ohio State University honored Sisson as its "Distinguished Alumnus". of the year.

Sisson served as editor alongside Stanley Wolpert of the volume of papers presented at the University of California, Los Angeles March 1984 international conference on the pre Independent phase of the Indian National Congress and published by the University of California Press.

Participating scholars in the conference include Dilip K. Basu, Judith M. Brown, Basudev Chatterji, Walter Huser, Stephen Northrup Hay, Eugene Irschick, Raghavan N. Iyer, D. A. Low, James Manor, Claude Markovits, John R. McLane, Thomas R. Metcalf, W. H. Morris Jones, V. A. Narain, Norman D. Palmer, Gyanendra Pandey, Bimal Prasad, Barbara N. Ramusack, Rajat Kanta Ray, Peter Reeves, Damodar Sardesai, Sumit Sarkar, Lawrence L. Shrader, William Vanderbok and Eleanor Zelliot.

References

Presidents of Ohio State University
Ohio State University College of Arts and Sciences alumni
Place of birth missing (living people)
Living people
1936 births
21st-century American historians
21st-century American male writers
American political scientists
Ohio State University Graduate School alumni
American male non-fiction writers